The Synagogue Don Isaac Abravanel, also known as the Synagogue de la Roquette, is a historic synagogue in the 11th arrondissement of Paris, France. It was built in 1962 for Jews who emigrated to France from Algeria, Morocco and Tunisia as a result of decolonization. It was designed by architects Alexandre Persitz and Arthur-Georges Héaume in the Modernist style. It was named in memory of Isaac Abravanel.

References

11th arrondissement of Paris
1962 establishments in France
Algerian-Jewish culture in France
Modernist architecture in France
Moroccan diaspora in France
Moroccan-Jewish diaspora
North African diaspora in Paris
Sephardi Jewish culture in France
Sephardi synagogues
Synagogues completed in 1962
Synagogues in Paris
Tunisian-Jewish culture in France